"Speak to Me" is a song by Pink Floyd from the 1973 album The Dark Side of the Moon. The phrase may also refer to:
Speak to Me, a 1969 song by Jackie Lomax
Speak to Me, a song by Audio Adrenaline from the 2001 album Lift
Speak to Me, a 2007 album by Geoff Moore
Speak to Me, a 2008 EP by Imagine Dragons
Speak to Me, a song by Roxette from the 2011 album Charm School
Speak to Me, a 2017 song by Amy Lee